Santa Eulàlia is a Barcelona Metro station, just inside the boundary of the municipality of L'Hospitalet de Llobregat with the city of Barcelona, and named after the nearby Santa Eulàlia neighbourhood. The station is served by line L1.

The station is situated alongside the south side of main line tracks from the western exit of Sants railway station, with the Pont de La Torrassa to the west and the Riera Blanca to the east. Both platforms have access from a below-track ticket hall on the Riera Blanca, and an above-track ticket hall linked to the Pont de La Torrassa. The Santa Eulàlia metro train depot is immediately to the south of the station.

The station has existed on two different sites. The first, somewhat to the west of the current site, was opened in 1932 as the western terminus of a one stop extension of line L1 from Bordeta station. The station was relocated in 1983, at the time of the further extension of the line to Torrassa station. At the same time, Bordeta station was closed, as it was deemed too close to the new Santa Eulàlia station.

References

External links

Barcelona Metro line 1 stations
Railway stations in Spain opened in 1932
Railway stations in L'Hospitalet de Llobregat